Daniel DeWayne Severn (born June 8, 1958), nicknamed "The Beast", is an American professional wrestler, retired mixed martial artist and amateur wrestler. A UFC Hall of Fame member, Severn is considered one of the leading pioneers of mixed martial arts and the first true world-class wrestler to compete in the Ultimate Fighting Championship. He is best known for his success in the early years of the UFC where he became the only UFC Triple Crown champion in history. Severn has also competed in King of the Cage, PRIDE FC, Cage Rage, WEC, RINGS and MFC, and holds a professional MMA Record of 101–19–7.

In professional wrestling, Severn is a two-time world champion by winning the NWA Worlds Heavyweight Championship twice, with his first reign lasting for over four years, and an NWA Hall of Fame member. During his almost year-long tenure with the World Wrestling Federation, he was managed by Jim Cornette and was perhaps most famous for making his entrance with the numerous UFC and NWA championships he had accumulated. He is the first man to compete in UFC and WWF at the same time and held the NWA and UFC championships at the same time. Severn is a world record holder for holding 13 championships. He is also the only person to be honored by the George Tragos/Lou Thesz Professional Wrestling Hall of Fame three times.

In amateur wrestling, Severn was a two time All-American at Arizona State University and a U.S. Olympic Team alternate.

Early life
Severn was born and raised in mid-Michigan , living in both Montrose and Coldwater , and grew up farming. He learned a lot on the farm and "got his hands dirty".

Severn was a basketball player during junior high school. He was influenced in sports from a young age. During his teen years, he took part in combat sports taking as he competed in amateur wrestling. He says that the coach approached him to fill in for a weight class in amateur wrestling after a sickness had gone around his school and led to a shortage of competitors, Severn signed to compete for the high school amateur wrestling team and received training.

Amateur wrestling career
Severn has a long history in Greco-Roman and freestyle wrestling. His amateur wrestling career started in high school and according to many was an "absolute machine" at 191.5 pounds. He won both sports' national championships in 1976 and was named the "Outstanding High School wrestler in the nation". Before his 18th birthday, he was already ranked top six in the nation in the open division and placed in the Olympic trials. Severn was inducted into Arizona State University's wrestling hall of fame at the end of his collegiate career.

Severn was a two time All-American at Arizona State University, the original Sunkist Kid of the Sunkist Kids, and a wrestling coach at both his alma mater Arizona State and Michigan State. In addition to his home country, he has wrestled in Canada, Mexico, Brazil, Japan, England, and several other countries. Severn won a gold medal at the 1985 National Sports Festival, and a berth on the U.S. World team.

Severn failed to win in Olympic trials in 1984 and 1988, and was a finalist in the trials. During the 1984 Olympic trials, he lost the final qualifying match in controversial fashion to eventual gold medal winner Lou Banach, a match that Severn credits with launching his career. "I would have retired in 1984 from competition had everything gone the way it should have gone...I should have been on the Olympic freestyle wrestling team and I should have won the gold medal. Instead, I went to Los Angeles as the alternate, and saw the guy I thought I beat win the gold medal. It was really tough for me to swallow that. That's what kept me going on." In his long career, he has held many national and international titles. He was often introduced to the UFC Octagon as holding more than 100 in total. Severn also held the US national record for victories by pin from 1976 to 1992.

After completing his degree program and graduation Severn entered numerous competitions from 1982 to 1994 that took him to Japan, Hungary, Cuba, France, and Turkey. On each trip, Severn captured another title. He also secured 13 National AAU wrestling championships during those years. The Beast also tried his hand at coaching wrestling at ASU and Michigan State University as he continued to compete and excel after his collegiate career.

Severn has been profiled in the press around the world in such publications as USA Today, People, Karate and Kung Fu Illustrated, Black Belt Magazine, MAD, Full Contact Fighter, and many of the pro wrestling publications. Severn also runs a wrestling product company and holds annual wrestling clinics for kids of all ages. He has appeared on 48 Hours, 20/20, The Gordon Elliott Show, Nash Bridges, and many commercials.

Severn has developed a  training facility on his property called "Michigan Sports Camps" in Coldwater, Michigan. This facility is able to house and train individuals for mixed martial arts, boxing, kickboxing, amateur wrestling and professional wrestling.

Mixed martial arts career

Background
Severn started cross-training in Judo in college, in an effort to improve his wrestling skills. Severn would later use his wrestling and Judo skills to compete in the Russian martial art of Sambo, becoming AAU Sambo champion, while he also gained experience in Jujutsu prior to the UFC.

Ultimate Fighting Championship (1994–2000)
In 1994, Severn started competing in the Ultimate Fighting Championships (UFC). In his first fight at UFC 4, he surprised many UFC fans by executing two impressive back suplexes on Anthony Macias. In the finals, Severn was defeated by Royce Gracie who secured a triangle choke for the victory. The submission loss came after Severn avoided Gracie's submission efforts for 15 minutes, the longest UFC fight up until that time. He was the first world-class wrestler to enter the UFC, foreshadowing the period of dominance by wrestlers such as Don Frye in UFC 8 and 9 and Mark Coleman in UFC 10 and 11.

Severn soon returned to mixed martial arts competition, defeating several opponents to capture the tournament championship at UFC 5: Return of the Beast. Severn's second fight was with Russian Oleg Taktarov at UFC 5. He won by TKO after the referee stopped the fight due to a cut.

After winning UFC 5, Severn was matched up with Ken Shamrock at UFC 6 to determine the first UFC Superfight Champion, but was defeated by Shamrock early in the fight via submission.

Severn then entered the UFC's Ultimate Ultimate 1995, which at the time was the toughest and most competitive tournament in UFC history, consisting of past UFC tournament champions and runners-up. Severn defeated Paul Varelans, David "Tank" Abbott, and UFC 6 Tournament Champion Oleg Taktarov all in the same night to capture the tournament title.

With this win, Severn earned a rematch and title shot against then current UFC Champion Ken Shamrock for the UFC Superfight Championship. Severn won a split decision in what most fans regard as one of the worst fights in MMA history, mainly due to legal issues surrounding the event. With the win, Severn captured his third title for the promotion.

When Severn made his entrance in his fights, he would carry the National Wrestling Alliance Worlds Heavyweight Championship out of his respect and passion for professional wrestling. Conversely, he made his entrance in WWF with his UFC Championship.

In 1996, Severn managed his friend and fellow wrestler and judoka Don Frye, as well as wrestling champion Dan Bobish, in their own mixed martial arts ventures. Frye would win the UFC 8, UFC 10 and Ultimate Ultimate 96 tournaments. The team was also expanded with female judoka Becky Levi.

In 1999, Severn founded 'The Danger Zone', a new mixed martial arts promotion intended to provide a platform for amateur fighters, in which Severn also fought. Severn has also trained and became a mentor to notable mixed martial artists including former UFC Light Heavyweight Champion Rashad Evans, The Ultimate Fighter competitor Luke Zachrich, Sean Sherk, and former UFC Light Heavyweight Champion Quinton "Rampage" Jackson.

In 2000, Severn returned to the UFC for UFC 27, quickly losing to Pedro Rizzo after a kick to the knee.

Severn was inducted into the UFC Hall of Fame at UFC 52.

Later career (2000–2013)
Severn continued his MMA career on January 29, 2011, by racking up his 97th, and 8th straight, win over Scott Fraser. In doing so he won the Elite 1 Heavyweight championship. The end came at 4:59 of Round 2 as Fraser tapped to Severn's arm triangle which he has used to secure his last three victories. The event took place at the Casino New Brunswick in Moncton, New Brunswick, Canada.

Severn successfully defeated Cal Worsham again, this time via unanimous decision in the main event of Legends Collide 2 on February 20, 2011. Held under the long running Gladiator Challenge promotion in San Jacinto, California, Severn picked up his 9th straight win to improve his record to 98-16-7.

Severn earned his 100th career victory on April 16, 2011, with a submission victory over Aaron Garcia at KOTC: Texas.

Severn is one of only two fighters with over 100 wins in mixed martial arts. He has beaten the other fighter, Travis Fulton, and drew against him in the rematch.

Retirement and attempted return to competition (2013–2016)
On January 1, 2013, Severn announced his retirement from MMA competition.

Severn was scheduled to face fellow mixed martial arts veteran Ken Shamrock on March 20, 2016, in a MMA match for the upstart URFight promotion. However, Shamrock claimed to have been injured during his bout with Royce Gracie at Bellator 149, and was later suspended after his pre-fight blood sample tested positive for banned substances. Tank Abbott was brought in as a late replacement but failed a pre-fight physical and the bout was scrapped altogether. Severn later appeared at the event and articulated his plans to continue his fighting career and his hopes to fight at a future URFight event. Severn later released a statement condemning Shamrock's actions and casting doubt upon his injury claims.

Professional wrestling career

Early career
As Severn is accomplished in amateur wrestling, he is also an accomplished professional wrestler, having competed in shoot style wrestling for UWF International in Japan, as well as the National Wrestling Alliance (NWA), and the World Wrestling Federation (WWF) in the US. Severn claims Lou Thesz as an influence to professional wrestling. Thesz would later become a fan of Severn after watching him compete in UWFi and UFC, praising Severn's wrestling skills.

Severn originally started competing in professional wrestling in 1992 for UWF-I (Universal Wrestling Federation International) under the Union Of Professional Wrestling Force. This is the international version and not to be confused with UWF-J which is the Japanese version. In his debut match on November 25, 1992, he defeated Yuko Miyato. (also known as Shigeo Miyato) He then defeated the likes of Yoji Anjo, and Kiyoshi Tamura, which lead to 1993. On February 14, 1993, Dan Severn was defeated by Nobuhiko Takada. This was Severn's first official loss in professional wrestling.

On January 28, 1994, Severn began to wrestle for All American Pro Wrestling (AAPW) and faced Shinobi in a winning effort. One day later he beat his former trainer, Al Snow on an AAPW show. Severn began to branch out to other promotions such as Border City Wrestling (BCW) and Continental Championship Wrestling (CCW). On August 13, 1993, in UWF-I, Severn and Gary Albright defeated Kiyoshi Tamura and Nobuhiko Takada. This was Severn's first tag team match, thus beginning his tag team career. 1993 was the first year that Severn made the Pro Wrestling Illustrated 500, at No. 389.

During his time with the Union Of Professional Wrestling Force International, Severn participated in the Best Of The World 1994 tournament, Dan finished before the semi-finals.

On January 6, 1995, at NWA Sabu, Severn defeated Johnny Johnson in a "Wrestling vs Boxer" match. On February 18, 1995, Severn was the number one contender against Bruiser Bedlam for Midwest Territorial Wrestling Heavyweight Championship at a MTW show. However the match ended in a no contest thus saw Bedlam retain the title.

National Wrestling Alliance (1995–2010) 
He entered the National Wrestling Alliance in 1995, and defeated Chris Candido for his first NWA World Heavyweight Championship on a Smoky Mountain Wrestling (SMW) card. Severn went on to win the UFC 5 tournament Championship that year, making him the first and only man to hold an MMA and a professional wrestling championship simultaneously. Severn held the NWA Championship for four years, the longest reign in over two decades and as of currently the third-longest reign in the belt's history. Severn defended the title on various NWA promotions such as NWA New Jersey and Outaia Pro Wrestling.

Severn was ranked No. 4 for the "most inspirational wrestler" award and No. 35 on the PWI 500 by Pro Wrestling Illustrated in 1995.

Severn paid tribute by defending the NWA title on the following shows: On April 12, 1997, on the NWA 2nd Annual Eddie Gilbert Memorial Brawl, Dan Severn fought Dory Funk Jr. and the match ended in a double count-out for Severn to retain the NWA world heavyweight title. On February 28, 1998, on the NWA 3rd Annual Eddie Gilbert Memorial Brawl, Dan Severn defeated Franz Schuhmann to retain the NWA world heavyweight title.

In 2010, Severn was inducted into the NWA Hall of Fame.

World Wrestling Federation (1997–1999)
Severn made his first appearance in the WWF with the NWA Worlds Heavyweight Championship on June 23, 1997, to join the color commentary team. Severn had not signed a contract with WWF by this point. He commentated on Ken Shamrock's match against Rockabilly (Billy Gunn). Ken won the match with a belly-to-belly suplex followed by an ankle lock. After the match, the two had a stare down and eventually shook hands.

As NWA champion, Severn debuted in the World Wrestling Federation in 1998 during a story line where the NWA invaded the WWF. Severn also wrestled on NWA territories at the same time during his tenure with the WWF. Severn was first seen attacking The Headbangers when they were feuding with Bob Holly and Bart Gunn, who were a part of the NWA invasion. In his debut match, he defeated Flash Funk in quick fashion. He was briefly managed by Jim Cornette who commentated during his matches and helped "get him over". During his entrance, he and Jim carried his titles consisting of UFC/MMA championship belts and the NWA world's heavyweight title. Cornette stated that "He has so many titles he keeps some at home because he can't take them in the airport", which is why Dan brought his most prestigious championships. His character was portrayed as a heel (villain). Like Flash Funk, he defeated multiple opponents afterwards, the likes of Savio Vega and Mosh, in quick fashion and by showing some of his Mixed Martial style and ability. This led to a winning streak. The NWA invasion was brief and saw the debut of The Midnight Express and a repackaged Jeff Jarrett. Barry Windham was also a member. Severn would tag team with these members from the stable. Severn would then leave the stable soon after to continue further singles competition on his own.

He feuded with old MMA rival Ken Shamrock, where the WWF played up their history in UFC. During his one-year tenure, he competed in the Brawl for All tournament, (a legitimate shoot boxing competition) beating The Godfather in the first round. However, he withdrew prior to the quarterfinals, allowing The Godfather to advance by default. He would also take part in the 1998 King of the Ring tournament, defeating D'Lo Brown and Owen Hart before losing to The Rock in the semi-finals.

Dan made his WWF Shotgun Saturday night debut in the opening match against G.I Will in a squash match. On the June 8, 1998, episode of Monday Night Raw, Severn would (kayfabe) injure Brown's rib cage via the bow and arrow submission hold, causing him to wear a chest protector for the next few months. On July 28, 1998, Severn competed against D'Lo Brown for the WWF European Championship. He would win the match by disqualification, meaning Brown retained the championship.

Later that year he was involved in a storyline with Owen Hart, where Hart caused an (kayfabe) injury to the neck of Severn, via a piledriver. He was part of the 1999 Royal Rumble, being the 8th entrant and lasting almost 6 minutes before being eliminated by Mabel. He left the WWF due to creative differences. His last match was on the following Raw, where Steve Blackman defeated Severn via disqualification. In house shows leading up to this, Blackman would defeat Severn every time.

According to Severn, shortly before the 1999 Royal Rumble WWF asked to him to tattoo "666" on his forehead ("the mark of the beast") and become an Undertaker disciple, presumably as part of his Ministry of Darkness stable forming during that time. Severn refused to do this, telling the company that he was uncomfortable with the nature of the storyline. When the company responded by telling Severn that they would bury his character if he declined to do as they asked, Severn countered by threatening to use his legitimate wrestling and fighting skills to shoot on his coworkers and make them “look silly” in the process. This caused the WWF to back off on the idea, but Severn still asked for and received a release not too long after.

Severn, in a recorded interview stated that the talent of the locker room was scared of him. He said he noticed this when they referred to him as "Mr. Severn" and thought it was a "rib" (joke) as well as wrestlers avoiding him. He asked one of the talent and they responded saying "You scare us. We're afraid that you're going to wig out in one of our matches."

Independent promotions (2000–present)
Severn appeared in 2000 in the short-lived WXO promotion. In 2002, he again won the NWA World Heavyweight Championship, this time from Shinya Hashimoto in Japan. This title reign was controversial and short-lived, as the title was stripped from Severn when he was unable to appear on the inaugural NWA-TNA pay-per-view to defend his title; the belt was won that evening by Ken Shamrock.

Severn founded Price of Glory Wrestling with Mark Pennington, based out of Coldwater, Michigan in June 2004. Utilizing the many students at his pro wrestling school Michigan Sports Camps, they created the now popular promotion running on a monthly basis. Severn has competed many times on Price of Glory Wrestling against the likes of Jimmy Jacobs, N8 Mattson, CJ Otis, Jack Thriller and more. He was a referee for Price of Glory 17: Merry Massacre in 2005.

In 2006 Severn wrestled on AWE, the television series which had 1 season and 7 episodes on the fight network. After this, the AWE folded due to financial issues.

On June 21, 2009 on Price of Glory wrestling (PoG), Severn and Johnny Dynamo had a career vs career match in which the loser has to end their career. Both competitors cut a promo on each other, Dan worked as the face meanwhile Johnny worked as a heel. Johnny, who had the Price of Glory heavyweight championship defended the title in this match. After a technical match-up, Severn came out as the victor and won the Price of Glory Heavyweight championship. The show ended with the two wrestlers showing respect to each other and the roster coming out in respect of the end of Dynamos career.

In 2015, on Great North Wrestling (GNW) Dan faced Hannibal for the Great North Wrestling Canadian Championship in a losing effort.

In May 2016, Dan signed with AIW for a promotional deal. He was put into a championship tournament named the "JT Lightning Invitational Tournament 2016" Severn advanced by defeating Colin Delaney. Severn was knocked out of the tournament in the semi finals in a fatal four-way match when Raymond Rowe was the victor against Dan, Tim Donst and Tracey Williams.

On February 4, 2017, Severn was inducted into the War Wrestling Hall of Fame in Lima, OH.

On May 12, 2017, Dan Severn competed at Gladiator Championship Wrestling against Brent Myers in a winning effort via his Beast Choker finishing submission move. Then on June 3, Dan returned to Price of Glory Wrestling where he defeated "so fine" Frank Isaac Anderson, who Severn trained to become a professional wrestler.

On March 17, 2019, Josh Barnett announced via Twitter that Severn would be participating in Game Changer Wrestling's (GCW) "Bloodsport" event, an event that features worked matches presented in a shoot style. Severn is set to take on former UFC Heavyweight champion Frank Mir in Mir's professional wrestling debut on April 4.

On April 5, 2019, Severn appeared for Major League Wrestling at their second Battle Riot event. He competed in the titular match, entering at number two and was eventually eliminated by Minoru Tanaka.

Acting career
Severn has starred in various movies and television series, starting in 1993 with Rudy, in which he played a football player. The movie is a sports/drama film directed by David Anspaugh.

Severn then appeared in two episodes of Nash Bridges in 1998 and 1999.

In 2005, he played a police captain in Swamp Zombies, an action/horror film directed by Len Kabasinski.

In 2010, Severn acted as an applicant for the movie Minor League: A Football Story directed by Clenet Verdi-Rose. The movie is a sport/comedy/drama about a struggling minor league football team that is not doing well and as their newly signed coach, Severn gives the team a second chance to change things around.

Also in 2010, Severn acted as "The Beast" in the action movie called Kill Factor directed and written by Leo Fong. The plot is about a detective on the track of a serial killer in L.A.

In late 2010, Severn played himself in Tetherball: The Movie directed by Chris Nickin. It is a sports/comedy movie and the plot of the movie is that three friends decide to start a tetherball league and wind up becoming amateur athletes and have "more booze, babes, and balls than they can handle."

In 2012, Severn acted in the amateur wrestling movie Win by Fall directed by Chris Nickin, as the character called Coach Winters. The movie is about a wrestler named Scott Reynolds, who is the state's best 152-pound wrestler. The team's 171-pound wrestler breaks his leg and coach Winters (played by Severn) moves Scott up to the 171-pound division. If Scott wants to go to college and earn a scholarship, he must win in his new weight class.

In 2014, Severn acted in College Fright Night which is a comedy/horror movie directed by Brad Leo Lyon. Severn plays as a police officer.

In 2016, Severn acted as a referee in Beyond the Game which is an action movie directed by Erken Ialgashev and written by J. Stephen Maunder and David Mitchell. The plot summary is contestants in a reality show have to fight to survive.

Also in 2016, Severn starred as the character Rich Chandler in The Fight Within, which is a sport/action/romance movie directed by Michael William Gordon. The movie is based on Logan Chandler, an MMA fighter.

In other media
Severn is featured on the front covers of many martial arts magazines such as the Tae Kwon Do Times and Karate Kung-fu.

Personal life
Severn was born in Coldwater, Michigan, and went to high school at Hill McCloy HS located in Montrose, Michigan. He has four brothers, all of whom were All-American wrestlers in high school and college. Severn has five children. His son, David Severn, is a professional and amateur wrestler. He has won two state championships in his home state of Michigan.>

Severn has an autobiography published named The Realest Guy in the Room: The Life and Times of Dan Severn. It was co-authored by Ian Douglass and was originally published on July 7, 2016. It includes a foreword from Jim Cornette, who managed Severn during his WWF run.

Severn owns his own mixed martial arts camp in Coldwater, Michigan.

Championships and accomplishments

Amateur wrestling
Arizona State University wrestling Hall of Famer
1980 Summer Olympic team alternate
13 National AAU wrestling championships from 1982 to 1994
1984 Summer Olympic team alternate
1985 Canada Cup Gold Medalist
1988 Summer Olympic team alternate

Mixed martial arts
In Judo
5th degree black belt
In Jiu-jitsu
2nd degree black belt
In Sambo
1st Razryad international master
World Extreme Cagefighting
Headlined and Won the main event of WEC 1
Ultimate Fighting Championship
UFC 5 Tournament Championship
Ultimate Ultimate 1995 Tournament Championship
UFC Superfight Championship (One time, last)
UFC 4 Tournament Runner Up
UFC Hall of Fame
UFC Viewer's Choice Award
First fighter to ever be awarded a UFC title belt
Triple Crown Champion (The first and only in UFC history)
The Danger Zone
Undefeated in Danger Zone single bout competition
Elite-1 MMA
Elite-1 MMA Heavyweight Championship (one time)
Continental Freefighting Alliance
CFA Super Heavyweight Championship (one time)
Gladiator Challenge
Gladiator Challenge Superfight Heavyweight Championship (one time)
Sherdog
Mixed Martial Arts Hall of Fame

Professional wrestling
Atlantic Terror Championship Wrestling
ATCW Heavyweight Championship (1 time)
Canada National Wrestling Alliance
MPW Tag Team Championship (1 time) - with Massive Damage
Cauliflower Alley Club
Lou Thesz Award (2010)
George Tragos/Lou Thesz Professional Wrestling Hall of Fame
Frank Gotch Award (2002)
George Tragos Award (2012)
Class of 2018
Great American Mat Endeavors
GAME Heavyweight Championship (1 time)
GAME Strong Style Heavyweight Championship (1 time)
Global Wrestling Alliance
GWA Heavyweight Championship (3 times)
Legends Pro Wrestling
LPW Hall of Fame (Class of 2012)
Monster Pro Wrestling
MPW Tag Team Championships (1 time) - with Massive Damage
National Championship Wrestling
NCW Heavyweight Championship (1 time)
National Wrestling Alliance
NWA United Kingdom Heavyweight Championship (1 time)
NWA Worlds Heavyweight Championship (2 times)
NWA Hall of Fame (2010)
Northern States Wrestling Alliance
NSWA Heavyweight Championship (1 time)
Price of Glory Wrestling
PoG Heavyweight Championship (1 time)
Pro Wrestling All-Stars Of Detroit
Denny Kass Memorial Battle Royal (2016)
Pro Wrestling Illustrated
Ranked No. 35 of the top 500 singles wrestlers in the "PWI 500" in 1995
Ranked No. 252 of the top 500 singles wrestlers of the "PWI Years" in 2003
 WAR Wrestling
WAR Hall of Fame (2017)

Mixed martial arts record

|-
| Win
| align=center| 101–19–7
| Alex Rozman
| Decision (unanimous)
| Blue Blood MMA
| 
| align=center| 3
| align=center| 5:00
| Davenport, Iowa, United States
| 
|-
| Loss
| align=center| 100–19–7
| Lee Beane
| KO (punches)
| Paul Vandale Promotions: The Beast Comes East
| 
| align=center| 1
| align=center| 3:28
| Worcester, Massachusetts, United States
| 
|-
| Loss
| align=center| 100–18–7
| Ryan Fortin
| KO (punches)
| King Of The Cage: Mile Zero
| 
| align=center| 3
| align=center| 4:04
| Dawson Creek, British Columbia, Canada
| 
|-
| Win
| align=center| 
| Aaron Garcia
| Submission (neck crank)
| KOTC: Texas
| 
| align=center| 1
| align=center| 2:18
| Lubbock, Texas, United States
| 
|-
| Win
| align=center| 99–17–7
| Cal Worsham
| Decision (unanimous)
| Gladiator Challenge: Legends Collide 2
| 
| align=center| 3
| align=center| 5:00
| San Jacinto, California, United States
| 
|-
| Win
| align=center| 98–17–7
| Scott Fraser
| Submission (arm-triangle choke)
| Elite-1 MMA: Tapping Out
| 
| align=center| 1
| align=center| 4:59
| Moncton, New Brunswick, Canada
| 
|-
| Win
| align=center| 97–17–7
| William Hatch
| Submission (arm-triangle choke)
| King of the Cage: Black Ops
| 
| align=center| 1
| align=center| 4:23
| Cold Lake, Alberta, Canada
| 
|-
| Win
| align=center| 96–17–7
| Tom Benesocky
| Submission (arm-triangle choke)
| King of the Cage 48
| 
| align=center| 1
| align=center| 1:33
| Edmonton, Alberta, Canada
| 
|-
| Win
| align=center| 95–17–7
| Chad Olmstead
| TKO (punches)
| King of the Cage: Lock Down
| 
| align=center| 2
| align=center| 1:27
| Edmonton, Alberta, Canada
| 
|-
| Win
| align=center| 94–17–7
| Sam Flood
| Submission (guillotine choke)
| King of the Cage: Fearless
| 
| align=center| 1
| align=center| 4:24
| Penticton, British Columbia, Canada
| 
|-
| Win
| align=center| 93–17–7
| Buddie Dixion
| TKO (punches)
| King of the Cage: Thunderstruck ll
| 
| align=center| 2
| align=center| 2:22
| Calgary, Alberta, Canada
| 
|-
| Win
| align=center| 92–17–7
| Eddie Trotter
| TKO (doctor stoppage)
| GFC: Gladiator Fighting Championship
| 
| align=center| 1
| align=center| 5:00
| Jenkins, Kentucky, United States
| 
|-
| Win
| align=center| 91–17–7
| Woody Young
| Submission (arm-triangle choke)
| KOTC: Disputed
| 
| align=center| 2
| align=center| 2:31
| Sault Ste. Marie, Michigan, United States
| 
|-
| Win
| align=center| 90–17–7
| Steve Eakins
| Decision (unanimous)
| Gladiator Challenge: The Beast
| 
| align=center| 3
| align=center| 5:00
| Elko, Nevada, United States
| 
|-
| Loss
| align=center| 89–17–7
| William Richey
| Decision (split)
| Iroquois: MMA Championships 7
| 
| align=center| 3
| align=center| 5:00
| Hagersville, Ontario, Canada
| 
|-
| Loss
| align=center| 89–16–7
| Pavel Botka
| Decision
| Heaven or Hell: Hell Cage
| 
| align=center| N/A
| align=center| N/A
| Prague, Czech Republic
| 
|-
| Win
| align=center| 89–15–7
| Damon Clark
| Submission (kimura)
| WFC: Armageddon
| 
| align=center| 1
| align=center| 2:30
| Denver, Colorado, United States
| 
|-
| Win
| align=center| 88–15–7
| Colin Robinson
| Decision (unanimous)
| Cage Wars: Max Extreme fighting
| 
| align=center| 3
| align=center| N/A
| Belfast, Northern Ireland
| 
|-
| Win
| align=center| 87–15–7
| Ian Asham
| Submission (kimura)
| Iroquois: MMA Championships II
| 
| align=center| N/A
| align=center| N/A
| Ohsweken, Ontario, United States
| 
|-
| Win
| align=center| 86–15–7
| Don Richards
| Decision (unanimous)
| KOTC: Bad Boys
| 
| align=center| 3
| align=center| 5:00
| Mount Pleasant, Michigan, United States
| 
|-
| Win
| align=center| 85–15–7
| Jimmy Westfall
| Decision (unanimous)
| Universal Fight Promotions
| 
| align=center| 3
| align=center| 5:00
| New Mexico, United States
| 
|-
| Win
| align=center| 84–15–7
| Mark Smith
| TKO (corner stoppage)
| Titans of the Pentagon
| 
| align=center| 1
| align=center| N/A
| San José, Costa Rica
| 
|-
| Win
| align=center| 83–15–7
| Victor Vincelette
| Submission (choke)
| WFC: Rumble in the Red Rocks
| 
| align=center| 1
| align=center| 1:35
| Camp Verde, Arizona, United States
| 
|-
| Win
| align=center| 82–15–7
| Terrell Pree
| Submission (armbar)
| WVF: Minot
| 
| align=center| 1
| align=center| 4:18
| Minot, North Dakota, United States
| 
|-
| Win
| align=center| 81–15–7
| Jason Keith
| Submission (rear-naked choke)
| GC 60: Invasion
| 
| align=center| 1
| align=center| 2:36
| Farmington, New Mexico, United States
| 
|-
| Win
| align=center| 80–15–7
| Kasey Geyer
| Submission (rear-naked choke)
| CCCF: Riverwind Rumble
| 
| align=center| 2
| align=center| 1:25
| Norman, Oklahoma, United States
| 
|-
| Win
| align=center| 79–15–7
| Clifford Coon
| Submission (rear-naked choke)
| CCCF: Red River Riot
| 
| align=center| 1
| align=center| 1:53
| Thackerville, Oklahoma, United States
| 
|-
| Loss
| align=center| 78–15–7
| Dave Legeno
| Decision (unanimous)
| Cage Rage 20
| 
| align=center| 3
| align=center| 5:00
| London, England
| 
|-
| Win
| align=center| 78–14–7
| Wade Hamilton
| Submission (americana)
| KOTC: Mass Destruction
| 
| align=center| 1
| align=center| 3:08
| Mount Pleasant, Michigan, United States
| 
|-
| Win
| align=center| 77–14–7
| Chris Clark
| Submission (heel hook)
| IFC: Rumble on the River 2
| 
| align=center| 1
| align=center| 3:08
| Kearney, Nebraska, United States
| 
|-
| Win
| align=center| 76–14–7
| Brian Heden
| Decision (split)
| NFA: Night of the Beast
| 
| align=center| 4
| align=center| 5:00
| Fargo, North Dakota, United States
| 
|-
| Win
| align=center| 75–14–7
| Skip Hall
| Submission (choke)
| Independent event
| 
| align=center| 1
| align=center| N/A
| Alabama, United States
| 
|-
| Win
| align=center| 74–14–7
| Lanny Griffin
| Submission (scarf hold)
| Indiana Martial Arts
| 
| align=center| 1
| align=center| 0:46
| Fort Wayne, Indiana, United States
| 
|-
| Win
| align=center| 73–14–7
| Robert Berry
| Submission (rear-naked choke)
| MMA Total Combat 16
| 
| align=center| 1
| align=center| 4:21
| Spennymoor, England
| 
|-
| Win
| align=center| 72–14–7
| Victor Vincelette
| TKO (submission to punches)
| WFC: Rumble in the Rockies
| 
| align=center| 1
| align=center| 1:22
| Loveland, Colorado, United States
| 
|-
| Loss
| align=center| 71–14–7
| Joop Kasteel
| KO (punch)
| Rings Holland: Men of Honor
| 
| align=center| 1
| align=center| 1:28
| Utrecht, Netherlands
| 
|-
| Win
| align=center| 71–13–7
| Tyson Smith
| TKO (submission to punches)
| Action Wrestling Entertainment
| 
| align=center| 1
| align=center| 4:12
| Winnipeg, Manitoba, Canada
| 
|-
| Loss
| align=center| 70–13–7
| Victor Valimaki
| Decision (unanimous)
| MFC 8: Resurrection
| 
| align=center| 3
| align=center| 5:00
| Edmonton, Alberta, Canada
| 
|-
| Win
| align=center| 70–12–7
| Rick Collup
| TKO (submission to knees)
| GC 39: Titans Collide
| 
| align=center| 2
| align=center| 3:11
| Porterville, California, United States
| 
|-
| Win
| align=center| 69–12–7
| Shannon Ritch
| Submission (triangle choke)
| Extreme Wars: X-1
| 
| align=center| 2
| align=center| 1:05
| Honolulu, United States
| 
|-
| Win
| align=center| 68–12–7
| Shannon Ritch
| Submission (americana)
| Northern Fighting Championships
| 
| align=center| 2
| align=center| N/A
| Alaska, United States
| 
|-
| Loss
| align=center| 67–12–7
| Bob Stines
| Submission
| Warrior: MMA 4
| 
| align=center| 1
| align=center| 0:52
| Corbin, Kentucky, United States
| 
|-
| Win
| align=center| 67–11–7
| Cal Worsham
| TKO (doctor stoppage)
| GC 34: Legends Collide
| 
| align=center| 3
| align=center| 3:29
| Colusa, California, United States
| 
|-
| Win
| align=center| 66–11–7
| Lee Mein
| TKO
| Continental Fighting Championships
| 
| align=center| 2
| align=center| 1:41
| Saskatoon, Saskatchewan, Canada
| 
|-
| Loss
| align=center| 65–11–7
| James Thompson
| Decision (unanimous)
| UC 11: Wrath of the Beast
| 
| align=center| 5
| align=center| 5:00
| Bristol, England
| 
|-
| Win
| align=center| 65–10–7
| Chad Rafdel
| TKO (corner stoppage)
| AFA: Beast
| 
| align=center| 1
| align=center| 3:00
| Iowa, United States
| 
|-
| Win
| align=center| 64–10–7
| Hidetada Irie
| Decision (unanimous)
| Gladiator FC: Day 1
| 
| align=center| 3
| align=center| 5:00
| Seoul, South Korea
| 
|-
| Win
| align=center| 63–10–7
| Ruben Villareal
| Decision (split)
| GC 27: FightFest 2
| 
| align=center| 2
| align=center| 5:00
| Colusa, California, United States
| 
|-
| Win
| align=center| 62–10–7
| Greg Lockhart
| Submission
| Dangerzone: Professional Level Cage Fighting
| 
| align=center| 2
| align=center| 1:45
| Osceola, Iowa, United States
| 
|-
| Win
| align=center| 61–10–7
| Johnathan Ivey
| Decision (unanimous)
| Hardcore Fighting Championships 3
| 
| align=center| N/A
| align=center| N/A
| Worcester, Massachusetts, United States
| 
|-
| Loss
| align=center| 60–10–7
| Tony Bonello
| Submission (rear naked choke)
| XFC 4: Australia vs The World
| 
| align=center| 1
| align=center| 1:36
| Brisbane, Australia
| 
|-
| Loss
| align=center| 60–9–7
| Ulysses Castro
| Submission (verbal)
| Enter the Beast
| 
| align=center| 3
| align=center| 2:45
| Nanaimo, British Columbia, Canada
| 
|-
| Draw
| align=center| 60–8–7
| Jerry Vrbanovic
| Draw
| KOTC 33: After Shock
| 
| align=center| 2
| align=center| 5:00
| San Jacinto, California, United States
| 
|-
| Loss
| align=center| 60–8–6
| Seth Petruzelli
| Decision (unanimous)
| KOTC 32: Bringing Heat
| 
| align=center| 3
| align=center| 5:00
| Miami, Florida, United States
| 
|-
| Win
| align=center| 60–7–6
| Ray Seraille
| Submission (armbar)
| Pacific X-Treme Combat
| 
| align=center| 3
| align=center| 2:03
| Mangilao, Guam, United States
| 
|-
| Win
| align=center| 59–7–6
| Mathias Hughes
| Submission
| Seasons Beatings
| 
| align=center| 1
| align=center| 2:40
| Winnipeg, Canada
| 
|-
| Draw
| align=center| 58–7–6
| Homer Moore
| Draw
| RITC 54: 'The Beast' vs 'The Rock'
| 
| align=center| 3
| align=center| 3:00
| Phoenix, Arizona, United States
| 
|-
| Win
| align=center| 58–7–5
| Gary Dudley
| TKO (punches)
| Gladiator Challenge 18
| 
| align=center| 1
| align=center| 2:08
| Colusa, California, United States
| 
|-
| Win
| align=center| 57–7–5
| Dan Christison
| Decision (split)
| KOTC 24: Mayhem
| 
| align=center| 3
| align=center| 5:00
| Albuquerque, New Mexico, United States
| 
|-
| Win
| align=center| 56–7–5
| Shane Moore
| Submission
| Hardcore Fighting Championships 1
| 
| align=center| 2
| align=center| 0:46
| Revere, Massachusetts, United States
| 
|-
| Win
| align=center| 55–7–5
| Cory Timmerman
| Decision (unanimous)
| KOTC 23: Sin City
| 
| align=center| 3
| align=center| 5:00
| Las Vegas, Nevada, United States
| 
|-
| Loss
| align=center| 54–7–5
| Ulysses Castro
| Decision
| MFC 6: Road To Gold
| 
| align=center| 3
| align=center| 5:00
| Lethbridge, Alberta, Canada
| 
|-
| Draw
| align=center| 54–6–5
| Pat Stano
| Draw
| War at the Shore
| 
| align=center| 3
| align=center| 5:00
| Atlantic City, New Jersey, United States
| 
|-
| Win
| align=center| 54–6–4
| Mike Ward
| Submission (bulldog choke)
| UC 4: Eyes of the Beast
| 
| align=center| 3
| align=center| 1:42
| Chippenham, England
| 
|-
| Win
| align=center| 53–6–4
| Justin Eilers
| Decision (unanimous)
| VFC 3: Total Chaos
| 
| align=center| 3
| align=center| 5:00
| Council Bluffs, Iowa, United States
| 
|-
| Win
| align=center| 52–6–4
| Mark Smith
| Submission (americana)
| KOTC 18: Sudden Impact
| 
| align=center| 1
| align=center| 2:56
| Reno, Nevada, United States
| 
|-
| Win
| align=center| 51–6–4
| Dan Christison
| Decision
| Aztec Challenge 1
| 
| align=center| 3
| align=center| 5:00
| Ciudad Juárez, Mexico
| 
|-
| Win
| align=center| 50–6–4
| John Jensen
| TKO (corner stoppage)
| KOTC 14: 5150
| 
| align=center| 1
| align=center| 5:00
| Bernalillo, New Mexico, United States
| 
|-
| Win
| align=center| 49–6–4
| Steve Sayegh
| TKO (submission to punches)
| Dangerzone: Caged Heat
| 
| align=center| 1
| align=center| 5:45
| New Town, North Dakota, United States
| 
|-
| Win
| align=center| 48–6–4
| Forrest Griffin
| Decision (unanimous)
| RSF 5: New Blood Conflict
| 
| align=center| 3
| align=center| 4:00
| Augusta, Georgia, United States
| 
|-
| Draw
| align=center| 47–6–4
| Travis Fulton
| Draw
| Iowa Challenge 3
| 
| align=center| 3
| align=center| 5:00
| Waterloo, Iowa, United States
| 
|-
| Win
| align=center| 47–6–3
| Lenn Walker
| TKO (submission to punches)
| UW: St. Paul
| 
| align=center| 1
| align=center| 1:49
| Saint Paul, Minnesota, United States
| 
|-
| Win
| align=center| 46–6–3
| Travis Fulton
| Decision (unanimous)
| WEC 1
| 
| align=center| 3
| align=center| 5:00
| Lemoore, California, United States
| 
|-
| Win
| align=center| 45–6–3
| Wes Sims
| Decision (unanimous)
| RSF 2: Attack at the Track
| 
| align=center| 3
| align=center| 4:00
| Chester, West Virginia, United States
| 
|-
| Win
| align=center| 44–6–3
| Harry Moskowitz
| Submission (americana)
| Reality Combat Fighting 11
| 
| align=center| 1
| align=center| 2:12
| Houma, Louisiana, United States
| 
|-
| Loss
| align=center| 43–6–3
| Jonathan Wiezorek
| Submission (choke)
| RSF 1: Redemption in the Valley
| 
| align=center| 2
| align=center| 1:03
| Wheeling, West Virginia, United States
| 
|-
| Win
| align=center| 43–5–3
| Aaron Keeney
| Submission (americana)
| Dangerzone: Insane In Ft. Wayne
| 
| align=center| 1
| align=center| 2:03
| Fort Wayne, Indiana, United States
| 
|-
| Win
| align=center| 42–5–3
| Travis Fulton
| Submission (rear-naked choke)
| Dangerzone: Night of the Beast
| 
| align=center| 1
| align=center| 2:01
| Lynchburg, Virginia, United States
| 
|-
| Loss
| align=center| 41–5–3
| Pedro Rizzo
| TKO (submission to leg kicks)
| UFC 27
| 
| align=center| 1
| align=center| 1:33
| New Orleans, Louisiana, United States
| 
|-
| Win
| align=center| 41–4–3
| Andrei Kopylov
| Decision (unanimous)
| Rings: Millennium Combine 3
| 
| align=center| 2
| align=center| 5:00
| Osaka, Japan
| 
|-
| Win
| align=center| 40–4–3
| John Dixson
| Submission (americana)
| Continental Freefighting Alliance 2
| 
| align=center| 1
| align=center| 5:18
| Corinth, Mississippi, United States
| 
|-
| Win
| align=center| 39–4–3
| Ron Rumpf
| Submission (americana)
| Dangerzone: Battle At The Bear
| 
| align=center| 1
| align=center| 0:54
| New Town, North Dakota, United States
| 
|-
| Win
| align=center| 38–4–3
| Robert Stines
| Submission (neck crank)
| Dangerzone: Ft. Wayne 2
| 
| align=center| 1
| align=center| 0:44
| Fort Wayne, Indiana, United States
| 
|-
| Win
| align=center| 37–4–3
| Marcus Silveira
| Submission (arm-triangle choke)
| WEF 9: World Class
| 
| align=center| 1
| align=center| 4:46
| Evansville, Indiana, United States
| 
|-
| Win
| align=center| 36–4–3
| Bart Vale
| TKO (doctor stoppage)
| CFA 1: Collision at the Crossroads
| 
| align=center| 2
| align=center| 0:36
| Corinth, Mississippi, United States
| 
|-
| Loss
| align=center| 35–4–3
| Josh Barnett
| Submission (armbar)
| SuperBrawl 16
| 
| align=center| 4
| align=center| 1:21
| Honolulu, United States
| 
|-
| Win
| align=center| 35–3–3
| Mark Jaquith
| Decision
| Dangerzone: Ft. Wayne
| 
| align=center| 1
| align=center| 15:00
| Fort Wayne, Indiana, United States
| 
|-
| Win
| align=center| 34–3–3
| Phil Ortiz
| Submission (americana)
| Extreme Challenge 28
| 
| align=center| 1
| align=center| 1:55
| Ogden, Utah, United States
| 
|-
| Win
| align=center| 33–3–3
| David Ferguson
| TKO (submission to punches)
| Dangerzone: Ft. Smith
| 
| align=center| 1
| align=center| 8:36
| Fort Wayne, Indiana, United States
| 
|-
| Win
| align=center| 32–3–3
| Nick Starks
| Decision
| Ultimate Reality Fighting
| 
| align=center| N/A
| align=center| 0:00
| Orlando, Florida, United States
| 
|-
| Win
| align=center| 31–3–3
| Brad Kohler
| TKO (slam)
| Ultimate Wrestling
| 
| align=center| 1
| align=center| 7:57
| Cleveland, Ohio, United States
| 
|-
| Win
| align=center| 30–3–3
| Slade Martin
| Submission (americana)
| Dangerzone: Mahnomen
| 
| align=center| 1
| align=center| 3:30
| Mahnomen, Minnesota, United States
| 
|-
| Win
| align=center| 29–3–3
| Ross Quam
| Submission (jaw lock)
| Brawl in the Black Hills 1
| 
| align=center| 1
| align=center| N/A
| Rapid City, South Dakota, United States
| 
|-
| Win
| align=center| 28–3–3
| Kevin Rosier
| Submission (bulldog choke)
| Cage Combat 1
| 
| align=center| 1
| align=center| 1:00
| Conesville, Iowa, United States
| 
|-
| Win
| align=center| 27–3–3
| Joe Frailey
| Submission (armbar)
| SuperBrawl 9
| 
| align=center| 1
| align=center| 4:02
| El Paso, Texas, United States
| 
|-
| Draw
| align=center| 26–3–3
| Pat Miletich
| Draw
| Extreme Challenge 20
| 
| align=center| 1
| align=center| 20:00
| Davenport, Iowa, United States
| 
|-
| Win
| align=center| 26–3–2
| Chris Franco
| TKO (doctor stoppage)
| SuperBrawl 8
| 
| align=center| 1
| align=center| 4:55
| Honolulu, Hawaii, United States
| 
|-
| Win
| align=center| 25–3–2
| Sam Adkins
| Submission (Fatigue)
| International Fighting Championships 8: Showdown at Shooting Star
| 
| align=center| 1
| align=center| 12:53
| Mahnomen, Minnesota, United States
| 
|-
| Win
| align=center| 24–3–2
| Steve Miller
| Submission (rear-naked choke)
| World Shoot Wrestling
| 
| align=center| 1
| align=center| 5:45
| Pasadena, Texas, United States
| 
|-
| Win
| align=center| 23–3–2
| John Calvo
| TKO (punches)
| SuperBrawl 7
| 
| align=center| 1
| align=center| 3:38
| Guam, United States
| 
|-
| Win
| align=center| 22–3–2
| Travis Fulton
| Submission (keylock)
| Gladiators 2
| 
| align=center| 1
| align=center| 10:39
| Iowa, United States
| 
|-
| Win
| align=center| 21–3–2
| Kevin Rosier
| TKO (knees)
| Extreme Challenge 15
| 
| align=center| 1
| align=center| 0:53
| Muncie, Indiana, United States
| 
|-
| Draw
| align=center| 20–3–2
| Kimo Leopoldo
| Draw (time limit)
| Pride 1
| 
| align=center| 1
| align=center| 30:00
| Tokyo, Japan
| 
|-
| Win
| align=center| 20–3–1
| John Renfroe
| Submission (keylock)
| International Fighting Championships 6: Battle at Four Bears
| 
| align=center| 1
| align=center| 2:28
| New Town, North Dakota, United States
| 
|-
| Win
| align=center| 19–3–1
| John Dixson
| TKO (submission to punches)
| International Fighting Championships 5: Battle in the Bayou
| 
| align=center| 1
| align=center| 2:33
| Baton Rouge, Louisiana, United States
| 
|-
| Win
| align=center| 18–3–1
| Lance Gibson
| Submission (keylock)
| SuperBrawl 5
| 
| align=center| 1
| align=center| 26:22
| Guam, United States
| 
|-
| Win
| align=center| 17–3–1
| Paul Buentello
| Submission (headlock)
| Unified Shoot Wrestling Federation 6
| 
| align=center| 1
| align=center| 2:55
| Amarillo, Texas, United States
| 
|-
| Win
| align=center| 16–3–1
| Ebenezer Fontes Braga
| TKO (doctor stoppage)
| International Vale Tudo Championship 1: Real Fight Tournament
| 
| align=center| 1
| align=center| 8:17
| Brazil
| 
|-
| Draw
| align=center| 15–3–1
| Jeremy Horn
| Draw
| Extreme Challenge 7
| 
| align=center| 1
| align=center| 20:00
| Council Bluffs, Iowa, United States
| 
|-
| Win
| align=center| 15–3
| John Renfroe
| TKO (punches)
| Extreme Challenge 6
| 
| align=center| 1
| align=center| 2:29
| Battle Creek, Michigan, United States
| 
|-
| Loss
| align=center| 14–3
| Mark Coleman
| Submission (scarf hold)
| UFC 12
| 
| align=center| 1
| align=center| 2:57
| Dothan, Alabama, United States
| 
|-
| Win
| align=center| 14–2
| Steven Goss
| Submission (rear-naked choke)
| Extreme Challenge 1
| 
| align=center| 1
| align=center| 1:53
| Des Moines, Iowa, United States
| 
|-
| Win
| align=center| 13–2
| Mitsuhiro Matsunaga
| Submission (reverse armbar)
| U-Japan
| 
| align=center| 1
| align=center| 1:32
| Tokyo, Japan
| 
|-
| Win
| align=center| 12–2
| Mario Neto
| Decision
| Universal Vale Tudo Fighting 4
| 
| align=center| 1
| align=center| 40:00
| Brazil
| 
|-
| Win
| align=center| 11–2
| Dennis Reed
| Submission (neck crank)
| Brawl at the Ballpark 1
| 
| align=center| 1
| align=center| 4:10
| Davenport, Iowa, United States
| 
|-
| Win
| align=center| 10–2
| Doug Murphy
| Submission (keylock)
| Vale Tudo Japan 1996
| 
| align=center| 1
| align=center| 3:23
| Urayasu, Chiba, Japan
| 
|-
| Win
| align=center| 9–2
| Ken Shamrock
| Decision (split)
| UFC 9
| 
| align=center| 1
| align=center| 30:00
| Detroit, Michigan, United States
| 
|-
| Win
| align=center| 8–2
| Oleg Taktarov
| Decision (unanimous)
| rowspan=3|Ultimate Ultimate 1995
| rowspan=3|
| align=center| 1
| align=center| 30:00
| rowspan=3|Denver, Colorado, United States
| 
|-
| Win
| align=center| 7–2
| Tank Abbott
| Decision (unanimous)
| align=center| 1
| align=center| 18:00
| 
|-
| Win
| align=center| 6–2
| Paul Varelans
| Submission (arm-triangle choke)
| align=center| 1
| align=center| 1:40
| 
|-
| Loss
| align=center| 5–2
| Ken Shamrock
| Submission (guillotine choke)
| UFC 6
| 
| align=center| 1
| align=center| 2:14
| Casper, Wyoming, United States
| 
|-
| Win
| align=center| 5–1
| Dave Beneteau
| Submission (keylock)
| rowspan=3|UFC 5
| rowspan=3|
| align=center| 1
| align=center| 3:01
| rowspan=3|Charlotte, North Carolina, United States
| 
|-
| Win
| align=center| 4–1
| Oleg Taktarov
| TKO (cut)
| align=center| 1
| align=center| 4:21
| 
|-
| Win
| align=center| 3–1
| Joe Charles
| Submission (rear naked choke)
| align=center| 1
| align=center| 1:38
| 
|-
| Loss
| align=center| 2–1
| Royce Gracie
| Submission (triangle choke)
| rowspan=3|UFC 4
| rowspan=3|
| align=center| 1
| align=center| 15:49
| rowspan=3|Tulsa, Oklahoma, United States
| 
|-
| Win
| align=center| 2–0
| Marcus Bossett
| Submission (arm-triangle choke)
| align=center| 1
| align=center| 0:52
| 
|-
| Win
| align=center| 1–0
| Anthony Macias
| Submission (choke)
| align=center| 1
| align=center| 1:45
|

See also
The NWA (wrestling stable)
Ultimate Fighting Championship
List of professional wrestlers by MMA record

References

Further reading
The Realest Guy in the Room: The Life and Times of Dan Severn (July 2016) 
The Ultimate Guide to Preventing and Treating MMA Injuries: Featuring advice from UFC Hall of Famers Randy Couture, Ken Shamrock, Bas Rutten, Pat Miletich, Dan Severn and more! (May 2016)

External links

Dan Severn at the United World Wrestling Database
Website of the film Catch - the hold not taken, featuring Dan Severn, a documentary on the impact of wrestling in the UFC
Interview on Genickbruch.com
Dan Severn at the National Wrestling Hall of Fame
Dan Severn's interview with John Kline of Elevation Radio
MuscleSport Radio interview with Joe Pietaro, June 16, 2009

1958 births
21st-century American male actors
American jujutsuka
American male film actors
American male judoka
American male mixed martial artists
American male professional wrestlers
American male sport wrestlers
American sambo practitioners
Arizona State University alumni
Heavyweight mixed martial artists
Living people
Mixed martial artists from Michigan
Mixed martial artists utilizing collegiate wrestling
Mixed martial artists utilizing freestyle wrestling
Mixed martial artists utilizing Greco-Roman wrestling
Mixed martial artists utilizing wrestling
Mixed martial artists utilizing jujutsu
Mixed martial artists utilizing sambo
Mixed martial artists utilizing judo
NWA World Heavyweight Champions
People from Coldwater, Michigan
Professional wrestlers from Michigan
Professional wrestling trainers
Ultimate Fighting Championship champions
Ultimate Fighting Championship male fighters
20th-century professional wrestlers